Herman Neils Segelke (born April 24, 1958) is a former pitcher in Major League Baseball. He appeared in three games for the Chicago Cubs in 1982, having been drafted by the team with the seventh pick of the 1976 Major League Baseball Draft. He was traded to the San Francisco Giants following the 1982 season, where he played two seasons in their farm system before finishing his professional career in 1984.

References

External links

1958 births
Living people
Major League Baseball pitchers
Chicago Cubs players
Gulf Coast Cubs players
Pompano Beach Cubs players
Midland Cubs players
Iowa Oaks players
Iowa Cubs players
Phoenix Giants players
Baseball players from California
People from San Mateo, California